Peter Trethewey (born 12 May 1935) is an Australian cricketer. He played in twenty-eight first-class matches for South Australia and Queensland between 1957 and 1963.

References

External links
 

1935 births
Living people
Australian cricketers
South Australia cricketers
Queensland cricketers
Cricketers from Adelaide